John Hamilton Wilkinson (July 9, 1911 — January 19, 1970) was a Canadian professional ice hockey player who played nine games in the National Hockey League for the Boston Bruins during the 1943–44 season. The rest of his career, which lasted from 1931 to 1944, was mainly spent in senior leagues.

Career statistics

Regular season and playoffs

External links
 

1911 births
1970 deaths
Boston Bruins players
Canadian ice hockey defencemen
Ice hockey people from Ottawa
Ontario Hockey Association Senior A League (1890–1979) players
Ottawa Senators (QSHL) players
Wembley Monarchs players